The Learning Tree is a 1969 American coming-of-age drama film written, produced, and directed by Gordon Parks. It depicts the life of Newt Winger, a teenager growing up in Cherokee Flats, Kansas, in the 1920s, and chronicles his journey into manhood marked with tragic events. Based on Parks' 1963 semi-autobiographical novel of the same name, The Learning Tree was the first film directed by a black filmmaker for a major American film studio, Warner Bros.-Seven Arts.

In 1989, The Learning Tree was one of the first 25 films selected by the Library of Congress for preservation in the United States National Film Registry for being "culturally, historically, or aesthetically significant".

Plot summary
In 1920s Kansas, a group of African-American boys, Newt Winger, Marcus Savage and friends steal apples from Jake Kiner's orchard, and when Jake (who is white) confronts the boys, he is beaten and left for dead by Marcus, who is later sent to jail for his actions. During the chase of Marcus and the boys, the racist white sheriff shoots dead an innocent black man, and is not punished.

Newt does well in school and aims to go to college; a white teacher tries to dissuade him, but the white principal opposes the racism of the town and encourages his ambitions.

While Marcus is in jail, Newt begins to work for Jake to make up for his actions and those of his friends, and also begins a relationship with the new girl in town, Arcella Jefferson, but his relationship with her is ultimately destroyed when Chauncey Cavanaugh, a white man and son of the local judge, rapes and impregnates Arcella, who ultimately moves away out of shame. Another scene depicts Newt winning a boxing match at the county fair.

One day when Newt had just woken up from a nap in the loft of Jake's barn, he witnesses the brutal attack and murder of Jake by Booker Savage, Marcus' father. Newt initially keeps quiet about what he has seen, but appears to be bothered that Silas Newhall, a white man, who was at the scene of the crime for another reason, is being accused for a murder he did not commit. Encouraged by his mother Sarah, Newt reveals to Judge Cavanaugh that Booker committed the murder, and also testifies in court, but rather than doing the good he intended it to do, Newt's testimony leads to the suicide of Booker. Newt is later almost killed by Marcus, who is then shot in the back by the sheriff while running away. Newt refuses a lift home from the sheriff, and walks away to an uncertain future.

Cast
 Kyle Johnson as Newt Winger
 Alex Clarke as Marcus Savage
 Estelle Evans as Sarah Winger
 Mira Waters as Arcella Jefferson
 George Mitchell as Jake Kiner
 Richard Ward as Booker Savage
 Malcolm Attenbury as Silas Newhall
 Russell Thorson as Judge Cavanaugh
 Zooey Hall as Chauncey Cavanaugh
 Dana Elcar as Sheriff Kirky
 Felix Nelson as Jack Winger
 Joel Fluellen as Uncle Rob

Background
The film The Learning Tree is based on Gordon Parks's 1963 semi-autobiographical novel of the same name. Parks also wrote the screenplay, and as a result the script for the film did not deviate much from the book, except for featuring fewer characters for the sake of running time. In addition to being the screenwriter, he was also the director, producer, and music composer. Burnett Guffey served as cinematographer, while Parks was assisted by Jack Aldworth and Fred Giles. Parks tried to include as many black technicians as possible on the film.

Parks personally chose Kyle Johnson to play the character of Newt, after a brief meeting with him in a Beverly Hills hotel. However, during the meeting, he gave no indication that he wanted to cast Johnson. Johnson kept getting called in for screen tests, and after the fourth test he found out that he had already been hired and the tests were meant to gauge the abilities of the other actors, not him. Johnson characterized the audition process as "not normal".

According to Turner Classic Movies, the original name of the film was Learn, Baby, Learn before it was changed to its current name. The current title appears to be taken from a line in the film, one that Sarah Winger tells her son Newt: "Let Cherokee Flats be your learning tree."

Film production 
The Learning Tree was bought by Warner Bros.-Seven Arts in 1969 and became the first film directed by a black person for a major American film studio. Parks later said of it:

The Learning Tree was shot on location in Fort Scott, Kansas, in the fall of 1968, and the production process was scheduled to take three months. Fort Scott had been where Parks grew up, and it was also the basis for the fictional town of Cherokee Flats.

Kyle Johnson remembers that when production began there was a circus in town. As a result, the circus scene in the film features an actual circus rather than a staged one. Moreover, the circus scene included citizens of Fort Scott, who were there for the circus in town anyway.

Additionally, Johnson recalls that his “most enjoyable work as an actor” was done under Gordon Parks. Specifically, Johnson says, “I really enjoyed The Learning Tree; for me it was like being part of a tight-run ship, a well-oiled machine. You do your part and you recognize its importance and relationship to all the other parts, cast, crew, director and so forth.”

Parks is said to have followed his instincts while filming, and also encouraged the actors to follow their own instincts while acting. This ease while filming arguably contributed to the fact that scenes were shot in very few takes.

During the film production, executives from Warner Bros. often visited the set. Warner sent representatives over to check up on Parks and to make sure that production was running smoothly, allegedly because Parks was an African-American director.

Exodusters 
In 1879, many African Americans migrated to Kansas and they became known as the "Exodusters". Among those who traveled were the ancestors of Gordon Parks. His father, Andrew Jackson Parks, was a tenant farmer in Kansas. Given that Gordon Parks was born in Fort Scott, Kansas in 1912, he was the "issue of the second generation of exodusters". His ancestral background played a role in choosing Fort Scott as the filming location for The Learning Tree.

The Exodusters earned their name after nearly 6,000 black Americans migrated to Kansas after the Emancipation. Their exodus was prompted by the 1879 Windom Resolution that encouraged African Americans to leave the southern states where they were still met with much hatred, even though the American Civil War had ended a little more than a decade earlier. Kansas promised a fresh start for the Exodusters, who wanted to begin a new life, in a new land, away from the southerners who had once enslaved them.

Depictions of black manhood 
The Learning Tree juxtaposes the lives of Newt Winger and Marcus Savage, two former friends that are trying to find themselves in a white-dominated Midwestern society. Though these two young men have different personalities and different goals in life, both characters represent two examples of black manhood.

Newt is a young man who tries to adhere to morals, although upset by the racial injustice of the day. When adversity occurs, he tries to act with dignity: when he and his friends steal from Jake Kiner, he attempts to make amends by working for him pro bono; when Chauncey Cavanaugh takes a liking to Newt's girlfriend Arcella, he does his best to protect her and ultimately he comes to term with his loss without showing aggression; he tells the truth in the Kiner murder trial, even though it exposes Booker Savage as the killer and African Americans are subsequently shown in an unfavorable light. Newt's determination to act ethically is a reflection of his moral character.

In contrast, Marcus is a young man who is also upset by the racial injustice of the day, but retaliates with violence. His rocky relationship with his father, Booker, does not help his psyche and predisposes him to violence. In the case of Marcus, he begins to embody violence, specifically when he beats Kiner and attempts to murder Newt for sending both him and his father to jail.

Soundtrack 
Gordon Parks composed and wrote the following score for The Learning Tree:
 The Learning Tree – Main Title, sung by O.C. Smith 
 The Storm To Calm
 Bluebird
 The Swimming Hole
 Concerto (Arcella's Theme)
 Birthday Present
 Chorale (The Learning Tree)
 Poor Tuck
 Questions & Answers
 My Baby's Gone (feat. Jimmy Rushing)
 The Fight
 Confrontation (feat. Kyle Johnson & Joel Fluellen)
 Hymn – End Title
New York Times reviewer Roger Greenspun praised the film's score in his review, saying that the music "telegraphs and then drains each crisis".

Reception 
When The Learning Tree premiered at the Trans-Lux Theater in New York City on August 6, 1969, it was well-received by critics. Roger Greenspun commented in his review that the scenes in the film took on a "kind of ceremonial vitality and lifelikeness". Parks and Guffey's strong attention to detail helped to make this film beloved and well-remembered to the American public.

The Learning Tree was one of the first 25 films to be listed on National Film Registry when the registry was created in 1989.

See also
 List of American films of 1969
 Nadir of American race relations

References

External links
The Learning Tree  essay by Maurice Berger on the National Film Registry website 

Film Notes from New York State Writer's Institute
The Learning Tree by essay by Daniel Eagan in America's Film Legacy: The Authoritative Guide to the Landmark Movies in the National Film Registry, A&C Black, 2010 , pages 651-652 

1960s coming-of-age drama films
1969 films
African-American films
American coming-of-age drama films
Films about racism
Films based on American novels
Films directed by Gordon Parks
Films set in Kansas
Films set in the 1920s
Films set in the 1930s
Films shot in Kansas
Films about rape
United States National Film Registry films
Warner Bros. films
1969 directorial debut films
1969 drama films
1960s English-language films
1960s American films